Steve Heinemann (born 1957) is a Canadian artist working in ceramics.

Born in Toronto, Ontario, Heinemann received an Honours diploma from Sheridan College School of Craft and Design, Oakville, Ontario in 1979, a B.F.A. from the Kansas City Art Institute, Kansas City, Missouri in 1984, and an M.F.A. from  the New York State College of Ceramics at Alfred University, Alfred, New York.

Body of work
His ceramic work has evolved from his interest in pottery. It is grounded in the idea of pottery as having an inner space that is the focus for imagination. Heinemann's self described element of his work is "..., the fundamental, preoccupying thread of containment continues throughout. I’m intrigued with the way spaces can appear to be concentrated. God knows that it’s the same space everywhere - inside or outside - but there’s something about the dynamic of containment that seems to charge one’s attention. Pots have always done that for me. One is held in that interior space perceptually." 

In 2017 he had a major retrospective at the Gardiner Museum in Toronto.

Academic career 
He has worked as an instructor at Sheridan College, in Mississauga, Ontario, and the Ontario College of Art and Design, in Toronto, Ontario, and has given workshops and lectures in ceramics at schools and universities in Canada, the United States, England, Japan, and Korea.

 New York State College of Ceramics at Alfred University, Alfred, New York, 1973–present
 Rhode Island School of Design, Providence, Rhode Island, 1970–73
 University of Nebraska at Omaha, 1968–1970

Awards 
Heinemann has been the recipient of a number of awards for his ceramic work including,
 Special Award, 2nd Word Ceramic Biennale, Korea (2003)
 Canada Council 'A' Grant
 Saidye Bronfman Award for Excellence in Canadian Craft, 1996
 Judge's Commendation, Fletcher Challenge International, Auckland, New Zealand (1996)
 Judge's Award, The 4th Ceramic International, Mino, Japan (1995)
 Award of Merit, Fletcher Challenge International, New Zealand (1995)
 Le Prix d'Excellence, National Biennial of Ceramics, Trois-Rivieres, Quebec (1994)
 Award of Merit, Fletcher Challenge International, New Zealand (1994)
 Bronze Medal, International Ceramic Invitational, Taipei (1993)
 Le Prix d'Excellence, National Biennial of Ceramics (1988)
 Prix Pierre Legros, National Biennial of Ceramics (1984)

Selected solo exhibitions 
 David Kaye Gallery, Toronto Canada (2017) 
 Galerie b 15, Munich, Germany (2004)
 Nancy Margolis Gallery, New York City, NY (2004)
 Galerie Elena Lee, Montreal, Quebec, Canada (2003)
 Ute Stebich Gallery, Lenox, MA (2002)
 Nancy Margolis Gallery, New York City, NY (2002)
 Gallery Materia, Phoenix (2001)
 Galerie Elena Lee, Montreal(1999, 2000)
 Selected Works, 1989–1999, York Quay Gallery II, Harbourfront Centre, Toronto (2000)
 Nancy Margolis Gallery, New York City, NY (1999)
 Prime Gallery, Toronto, Ontario (1995, 1999)
 Objects of Sight, Traveling exhibition organized by Burlington, Cultural Centre, Burlington, Ontario (1989–1991)
 Hopkins Hall Gallery, Ohio State University, Columbus, OH (1986)
 Anna Leonowens Gallery, Nova Scotia College of Art and Design, Halifax, NS (1984)
 Ontario Crafts Council, Toronto, Ontario (1982)

Selected public and private collections 
The works of Heinemann are displayed in a number of collections including;
 American Craft Museum (now The Museum of Arts & Design), New York City, NY
 Art Gallery of Nova Scotia, Halifax, Nova Scotia
 Auckland Museum, Auckland, New Zealand
 Canada Council Art Bank, Ottawa, Ontario
 Canadian Museum of Civilization, Ottawa, Ontario, Canada
 Frank Steyaert Museum, Ghent, Belgium
 Gardiner Museum of Ceramic Art, Toronto, Ontario
 Hong Ik University, Seoul, South Korea
 Montreal Museum of Fine Arts, Montreal, Quebec
 Museum of Fine Arts, Boston, Massachusetts
 Museum Het Kruithuis, 's-Hertogenbosch, The Netherlands
 National Museum of History, Taipei, Taiwan
 Ontario Crafts Council, Toronto, Ontario
 Taipei County Yinkgo Ceramics Museum, Taipei
 UBS Bank, Toronto
 Victoria and Albert Museum, London, UK
 Winnipeg Art Gallery, Winnipeg, Manitoba
 World Ceramic Center, Korea

References

External links
 Bronfman Collection Bio
 Biographical Information
 Short bio and display of works, Lacost Gallery
 Virtual Museum biographical information
 International  Association of Ceramists artist information

1957 births
Living people
New York State College of Ceramics alumni
Canadian ceramists
Canadian potters
Kansas City Art Institute alumni
Sheridan College alumni
Academic staff of OCAD University